Amjad Ismail Ahmed (born 1 January 1993) is a Sudanese professional footballer who plays as a centre-back for the Sudanese club Al-Ahly Shendi, and the Sudan national team.

International career
Ismail made his international debut with the Sudan national team in a 2–1 friendly loss to Gabon on 2 September 2016. He was part of the Sudan squad that was called up for the 2021 Africa Cup of Nations.

References

External links
 
 

1994 births
Living people
Sudanese footballers
Sudan international footballers
Association football defenders
Al-Ahly Shendi players
Sudan Premier League players
2021 Africa Cup of Nations players
Sudan A' international footballers
2022 African Nations Championship players